Zoolander 2 (promoted as Zoolander No. 2) is a 2016 American action comedy film directed by Ben Stiller and written by John Hamburg, Justin Theroux, Stiller, and Nicholas Stoller. It is the sequel to the 2001 film Zoolander. Stiller, Owen Wilson, Christine Taylor, Will Ferrell, Milla Jovovich, Nathan Lee Graham, Theroux, Kyle Mooney, Billy Zane, Tommy Hilfiger and Jerry Stiller reprised their roles while Alexander Skarsgård also returned in a different role. New cast members include Penélope Cruz, Kristen Wiig and Fred Armisen.

Filming took place from April to July 2015, in Rome, Italy. The film was released on February 12, 2016, by Paramount Pictures, to mostly negative reviews from critics and earned $56 million against a $55 million budget.

Plot 

At Fashion Interpol, a secret agent, Valentina Valencia examines the expressions of recently assassinated pop singers' last images and believes they match Derek Zoolander's signature look, "Blue Steel". A flashback reveals that the Derek Zoolander Center For Kids Who Can't Read Good collapsed, killing Matilda Jeffries and injuring Hansel McDonald two days after the events of the first film. Derek later lost custody of his son, Derek Zoolander Jr., and announced his retirement from modeling and subsequent reclusion.

Derek now lives alone in "extreme northern" New Jersey. Billy Zane visits and gives him an invitation to the House of Atoz fashion show by the "Queen of Haute Couture", Alexanya Atoz, and persuades him to return to a regular lifestyle in order to regain custody of his son. In the "uncharted Malibu territories", Hansel returns to his home after dinner and is informed by his orgy that they are all pregnant and that he is the father. He is later given the same invitation by Zane.

At the fashion show, Derek and Hansel are surprised to find that the ever-changing fashion world is now dominated by the likes of Don Atari and the non-binary All. They are put on the runway in "Old" and "Lame" outfits and are doused by a large bucket of prunes. Afterwards, Alexanya congratulates them on their performance.

After reuniting, Derek and Hansel are tracked down by Valentina, who asks them to help Interpol uncover who is behind the systematic assassinations. With Valentina's help, Derek discovers his son is residing at a local orphanage. They find him, but Derek is distraught by his son's obesity. After Matilda's ghost asks him to protect their son, Hansel convinces Derek to accept Derek Jr.  After meeting the Headmaster, Derek takes his son around Rome. However, Derek Jr. becomes disgruntled with his father and returns to the orphanage.

Hansel receives an anonymous call, requesting that he travel to St. Peter's Basilica at midnight. He, Derek, and Valentina go to the church and meet with Sting, who tells them the tale of Adam and Eve and the little-known Steve, a secret that many popstars have died to protect. It is said that Steve is the common ancestor of all models and that he and his closest descendant (Derek Jr.) holds the bloodline of the Fountain of Youth. Derek returns to the orphanage, only to find it in disrepair and his son and the Headmaster gone.

Jacobim "Mugatu" Moogberg tricks him into trading places with him so he can escape. Mugatu leaves on a helicopter while Hansel stows away by hiding on top of the rotor. Derek and Valentina swim back to Rome while Hansel infiltrates the House of Atoz. He witnesses Mugatu reuniting with Alexanya and killing Don Atari.

Hansel finds Derek Jr. imprisoned and reunites with Derek and Valentina at the IncrediBALL. They enter a bathhouse through a rear entrance and witness Derek Jr. strapped to a sacrificial table. Mugatu and many of the world's fashion designers prepare to cut out Derek Jr.'s heart and consume his blood, believing it to grant them eternal youth as it contains the blood of Steve. Derek, Hansel, and Valentina stop Mugatu from proceeding and he reveals that he brought together the world's fashion designers to kill them as revenge for leaving him imprisoned.

Alexanya, who is actually Katinka Ingabogovinana in disguise, attacks Valentina, and they start "sexy fighting," while Mugatu tells Derek that he was behind the destruction of his Center by hiring the construction crew to build a faulty base. He then throws an explosive towards the lava. Derek manages to stop it with "Magnum", but he struggles to keep it suspended in mid-air. Sting arrives and reveals that he is Hansel's father, and they, along with Derek Jr. releasing the look, "El Niño", successfully hurl the explosive back at Mugatu, presumably killing him in the process.

Derek Jr. forgives his father for his mother's death and Derek and Valentina confess their love for each other. Matilda's ghost gives them her blessing and says that Mugatu live-streamed the event. Six weeks later, Derek and Hansel have returned to modeling. Hansel returns to living with his orgy and is now the father of 10 children. Derek and Valentina have a daughter named Darlene V. Zoolander, while Derek Jr. becomes the next hot model and is now in a relationship with Malala Yousafzai. As the end credits start rolling, Derek and Hansel celebrate their heroism with their friends, Derek's family, and a newly reformed Mugatu, who survived the explosion.

Cast 

 Ben Stiller as Derek Zoolander, a male fashion model
 Owen Wilson as Hansel McDonald, a fashion model who was Derek's rival from the first film. 
 Will Ferrell as Jacobim "Mugatu" Moogberg, a fashion mogul who seeks revenge on Derek for his first defeat
 Penélope Cruz as Valentina Valencia, an Interpol agent who becomes Derek's love interest
 Kristen Wiig as Alexanya Atoz, Queen of Haute Couture
 Fred Armisen as Vip, an 11-year-old assistant to Don Atari. "Armisen’s face CGI-ed on a tween’s body".
 Kyle Mooney as Don Atari
 Milla Jovovich as Katinka Ingabogovinana, Mugatu's henchwoman
 Christine Taylor as ghost of Matilda Jeffries-Zoolander, Derek's late wife.
 Justin Theroux as Evil DJ
 Nathan Lee Graham as Todd, Mugatu's second in-command
 Cyrus Arnold as Derek Zoolander Jr., Derek & Matilda's son and Valentina's stepson
 Billy Zane as himself
 Jon Daly as Agent Filippo
 Sting as himself
 Benedict Cumberbatch as All, a non-binary fashion model

Cameos 

 Beck Bennett as Geoff Mille (uncredited)
 Jerry Stiller as Maury Ballstein
 Katy Perry as herself
 Neil deGrasse Tyson as himself
 Tommy Hilfiger as himself
 Naomi Campbell as herself
 Justin Bieber as himself
 Jourdan Dunn as Natalka, one of Hansel's orgy
 Ariana Grande as SM girl
 Christina Hendricks as Seductress
 John Malkovich as Skip Taylor, a prisoner convicted for crimes against fashion
 Kiefer Sutherland as himself, one of Hansel's orgy
 Mika as hairdresser
 Skrillex as "Old and Lame" Show DJ
 Susan Boyle as herself
 ASAP Rocky as himself
 MC Hammer as himself
 Anna Wintour as herself
 Marc Jacobs as himself
 Alexander Skarsgård as Adam 
 Karlie Kloss as Eve 
 Kate Moss as herself
 Alexander Wang as himself
 Valentino as himself
 Katie Couric as herself
 Christiane Amanpour as herself
 Jane Pauley as herself
 Natalie Morales as herself
 Soledad O'Brien as herself
 Don Lemon as himself
 Matt Lauer as himself
 Andy Dick as Don Atari's Posse
 Willie Nelson as himself
 Susan Sarandon as herself (uncredited)
 Lewis Hamilton as himself
 Joe Jonas as himself
 Jérôme Jarre as himself
 Stephen Hawking as himself

Production 
In December 2008, Stiller confirmed that he wanted to make a sequel to Zoolander, saying: "I've been trying to get Zoolander 2 together and we've had a few scripts. I feel that is the sequel I really would like to do some day because I like the original and I would make sure it was something new and worthy of it first." When interviewed on the May 15, 2009 episode of Friday Night with Jonathan Ross, Stiller said he was looking at a number of scripts. By February 2010, Justin Theroux, who also co-wrote Tropic Thunder with Stiller, was hired to write and direct the sequel. By the following month, Stiller confirmed he would be co-writing the script, stating, "We're in the process of getting a script written, so it's in the early stages. But yeah, it's going to happen." At some later, unspecified point, Stiller had taken over as director. On the December 17, 2010 episode of The Tonight Show with Jay Leno, Owen Wilson said a Zoolander sequel would likely be made, tentatively titled Twolander.

In January 2011, Stiller confirmed that the script had been completed, and described the plot: "It's ten years later and most of it is set in Europe... it's basically Derek and Hansel... though the last movie ended on a happy note a lot of things have happened in the meantime. Their lives have changed and they’re not really relevant anymore. It's a new world for them. Will Ferrell is written into the script and he's expressed interest in doing it. I think Mugatu is an integral part of the Zoolander story, so yes, he features in a big way." In July 2012, Stiller described a difficult development process: "We have a script, as we've had for a little while, and [the film] is not quite coming together right now but I hope it does. I would like to do it at some point in the future." In September 2014, Ferrell said of the sequel, "We are actually supposed to do a read-through of a sequel script soon, and Mugatu is a part of it."

By November 20, 2014, Penélope Cruz had joined the cast, and by January 29, 2015, Christine Taylor was confirmed to reprise her role as Matilda Jeffries. By February 9, 2015, it was announced filming was set to commence at Rome's Cinecittà studios in the spring of 2015. On March 10, 2015, Stiller and Wilson appeared at the Paris Fashion Week in character as Derek Zoolander and Hansel McDonald. On April 13, 2015, it was revealed Cyrus Arnold had been cast as Zoolander's son. On April 21, 2015, Fred Armisen joined the cast. In May 2015, Stiller revealed via Instagram the casting of Kyle Mooney, Beck Bennett, and Nathan Lee Graham.

Principal photography began on April 7, 2015, and ended on July 13, 2015. The film was shot at Cinecittà studios in Rome, Italy. During production, a 96 camera bullet time rig was used to catch the end sequence, but the footage was not used.

Marketing 
Paramount partnered with Fiat Chrysler Automobiles to feature Derek Zoolander on their advertising campaign for the Fiat 500X. Ben Stiller and Owen Wilson walked in character as Zoolander and Hansel at the Valentino show at 2015 Paris Fashion Week, and Stiller and Penélope Cruz also appeared in character in the February 2016 issue of Vogue.

Release
Zoolander 2 was released in theaters on February 12, 2016. The world premiere was held in London, England on February 6, 2016, and the North American premiere was held in New York City on February 9, 2016. During the London premiere, Stiller set the Guinness World Record for the longest selfie stick, at 8.56 meters (28 feet, 1 inch) long.

Transgender casting controversy
On November 20, 2015, shortly after the release of the second trailer, the film received controversy from LGBT community over Benedict Cumberbatch's portrayal of All, a non-binary model, which was deemed by the community as "an over-the-top, cartoonish mockery of androgyne/trans/non-binary individuals", with the community calling for a boycott of the film over the transgender character. In a December 7, 2015 interview with The Wrap, Justin Theroux said of the transgender boycott, stating that it "hurts my feelings", comparing it to the 2008 protest by disabled groups of the film Tropic Thunder for Robert Downey Jr.'s character's repeated use of the word "retard". Will Ferrell defended Cumberbatch's portrayal in a December 21, 2015 interview on BBC 1's Newsbeat. In a January 28, 2022 interview with Variety as part of its "Actors on Actors" with co-star Penelope Cruz, Cumberbatch stated that if the film had been made today, he wouldn't have played All, believing that the role should be played by a trans actor or a non-binary actor instead.

Reception

Box office 
Zoolander 2 grossed $28.8 million in the U.S. and Canada and $27.9 million in other territories, for a worldwide total of $56.7 million against a budget of $50 million.

In the United States and Canada, pre-release tracking suggested the film would gross $17–20 million from 3,300 theaters in its opening weekend, trailing Deadpool ($55–65 million projection) but similar to fellow newcomer How to Be Single. The film made $750,000 from its Thursday night previews and $4.9 million on its first day. It went on to gross $14 million in its opening weekend, finishing fourth at the box office, behind Deadpool ($132.8 million), Kung Fu Panda 3 ($19.8 million), and How to Be Single ($17.9 million). In its second weekend, the film grossed $5.5 million (a 60.3% drop), finishing seventh at the box office.

In a February 2022 interview with Esquire, Ben Stiller said he was glad the film flopped at the box office, stating that if the film had performed well at the box office, he wouldn't have been able to pursue doing more serious, non-comedic work such as Escape at Dannemora and Severance.

Critical response 
On Rotten Tomatoes, the film has an approval rating of 22% based on reviews from 232 critics, with an average rating of 4.42/10. The site's critical consensus reads, "Zoolander No. 2 has more celebrity cameos than laughs – and its meager handful of memorable gags outnumbers the few worthwhile ideas discernible in its scattershot rehash of a script." On Metacritic, the film has a score of 34 out of 100 based on reviews from 42 critics, indicating "generally unfavorable reviews". Audiences polled by CinemaScore gave the film an average grade of "C+" on an A+ to F scale, the same grade earned by its predecessor.

Peter Travers  of Rolling Stone wrote: "Zoolander 2 sweats its silly ass off to please. The results are scattershot. But when it works — oh, baby. There's a bit with Justin Bieber and a selfie that, well, no spoilers."
Justin Chang of Variety gave it a negative review: "The results may delight those who believe recycled gags and endless cameos to be the very essence of great screen comedy, but everyone else will likely recognize Stiller’s wannabe Magnum opus as a disappointment-slash-misfire, the orange mocha crappuccino of movie sequels."

Accolades

References

External links 
 
 

2016 films
2016 action comedy films
American films about revenge
American sequel films
American satirical films
American action comedy films
2010s English-language films
LGBT-related controversies in film
Casting controversies in film
Films about fashion in the United States
Films about modeling
Films directed by Ben Stiller
Films produced by Ben Stiller
Films produced by Scott Rudin
Films produced by Clayton Townsend
Films scored by Theodore Shapiro
Films set in 2016
Films set in New Jersey
Films set in Rome
Films shot at Cinecittà Studios
Films with screenplays by John Hamburg
Films with screenplays by Nicholas Stoller
Films with screenplays by Justin Theroux
Golden Raspberry Award winning films
Paramount Pictures films
Red Hour Productions films
2010s American films